John Vernon Warren (1826–1898) was a convict transported to Western Australia.  He was one of only 39 such convicts from the 9721 convicts transported to the colony to overcome the social stigma of convictism to become schoolteachers.

Born in 1826, Warren worked as a clerk in his youth, but in 1850 he was convicted of forging a bill of exchange, and sentenced to a lifetime of penal servitude.  He was transported to Western Australia on board the William Jardine, arriving in August 1852.  After receiving his ticket of leave, he taught at the Catholic school at York from 1860, and then at Newleyine from 1866 to 1868.  He then moved to the Wicklow Hills school, prompting the closure of the Newleyine school.  In 1870 he was dismissed for gross misconduct, but this did not stop him being appointed teacher at Dumbarton in 1872.  In September 1874, Warren married Mary Ann Elizabeth Gould, a wealthy widow who owned a hotel and a farm.  No longer needing to earn an income, he resigned as a teacher the following year.  He sailed for Singapore in 1881.

The position of ex-convicts in the Australian penal colonies led to significant political conflict during the nineteenth century (cf. emancipist). Most freed convicts became part of an underclass and the social characteristics of the convicts has been a point of Australian historiographic argument throughout the period of European settlement in Australia.

Warren was one of a very small number of convicts in Western Australia to overcome the social stigma of his conviction and obtain a respectable position in society. Although most respectable occupations were closed to ex-convicts, the colony was desperately short of teachers, yet unable to pay a sufficient wage to attract them.  Whereas educated people of the "free" class were not attracted to teaching positions, the positions were attractive to educated ex-convicts, for whom the salary was no lower than other vocations open to them, and the job offered a degree of respectability.  In total, 39 ex-convicts became school teachers in Western Australia.  Erickson (1983) has suggested that the use of ex-convict school teachers played an important role in the gradual breaking down of the social stigma of convictism.

References
 

1826 births
1898 deaths
Convicts transported to Western Australia
Settlers of Western Australia
Australian schoolteachers